Jack Newman may refer to:

 E. Jack Neuman (1921–1998), American writer and producer
 Jack Newman (runner) (1903–1976), Australian Olympic athlete
 Jack Newman (high jumper) (1916–1974), British Olympic athlete
 Jack Newman (New Zealand cricketer) (1902–1996), New Zealand sportsman and business executive
 Jack Newman (English cricketer) (1884–1973), English cricketer who played for Hampshire
 Jack Newman (doctor) (born 1946), Canadian physician
 Jack Newman (footballer) (born 2002), Scottish footballer (Dundee United)
 Jack Newman or Rory Jack Thompson (1942–1999), Australian CSIRO scientist and murderer

See also
 John Newman (disambiguation)